Ophiusa costiplaga is a moth of the family Erebidae. It is found on Kei, New Guinea and the coast of the Northern Territory of Australia.

External links
Image at Barcode of Life

Ophiusa
Moths described in 1924